The spectacle is a central notion in the Situationist theory, developed by Guy Debord in his 1967 book The Society of the Spectacle. In the general sense, the spectacle refers to "the autocratic reign of the market economy which had acceded to an irresponsible sovereignty, and the totality of new techniques of government which accompanied this reign." It also exists in a more limited sense, where spectacle means the mass media, which are "its most glaring superficial manifestation."  Debord said that the society of the spectacle came to existence in the late 1920s.

The critique of the spectacle is a development and application of Karl Marx's concept of fetishism of commodities, reification and alienation, and the way it was reprised by György Lukács in 1923. In the society of the spectacle, commodities rule the workers and consumers, instead of being ruled by them; in this way, individuals become passive subjects who contemplate the reified spectacle.

History and influences

Bernays and Adorno
Debord claims that in its limited sense, spectacle means the mass media, which are "its most glaring superficial manifestation". However, T. J. Clark regards this as a journalistic cliché. Clark argues that the spectacle came to dominate Paris during the Second Empire thanks to Haussmann's renovation of Paris. Debord, however, said that the society of the spectacle came to existence in the late 1920s. This is the period in which modern advertising and public relations were introduced, most significantly with the innovative techniques developed by Edward Bernays in his campaigns for the tobacco industry. In his 1928 book Propaganda, Bernays theorized the "conscious and intelligent manipulation of the organized habits and opinions of the masses." The critique of the society of the spectacle shares many assumptions and arguments with the critique of the culture industry made by Theodor W. Adorno and Max Horkheimer in 1944.

Marx and Lukács
With The Society of the Spectacle, Debord attempted to provide the Situationist International (SI) with a Marxist critical theory. The concept of "the spectacle" expanded to all society the Marxist concept of reification drawn from the first section of Karl Marx's Capital, entitled The Fetishism of Commodities and the Secret thereof and developed by György Lukács in his work, History and Class Consciousness. This was an analysis of the logic of commodities whereby they achieve an ideological autonomy from the process of their production, so that "social action takes the form of the action of objects, which rule the producers instead of being ruled by them."

Developing this analysis of the logic of the commodity, The Society of the Spectacle generally understood society as divided between the passive subject who consumes the spectacle and the reified spectacle itself. In a spectacular society, the system of commodity production generates a continual stream of images, for consumption by people who lack the experiences represented therein. The spectacle represents people solely in terms of their subordination to commodities, and experience itself becomes commodified.

In the opening of Das Kapital, Marx makes the observation that within the capitalist mode of production we evaluate materials not by what purpose they serve or what they're actually useful for, but we instead recognize them based on their value in the market. In capitalist society, virtually identical products often have vastly different values simply because one has a more recognizable or prestigious brand name. The value of a commodity is abstract and not tied to its actual characteristics. Much in the same way capitalism commodifies the material world, the situationists assert that advanced capitalism commodifies experience and perception.

Features and aspects of the Spectacle

Recuperation

As early as 1958, in the situationist manifesto, Debord described official culture as a "rigged game", where conservative powers forbid subversive ideas to have direct access to the public discourse. Such ideas get first trivialized and sterilized, and then they are safely incorporated back within mainstream society, where they can be exploited to add new flavors to old dominant ideas. This technique of the spectacle is sometimes called recuperation.

To survive, the spectacle must maintain social control and effectively handle all threats to the social order. Recuperation, a concept first proposed by Guy Debord, is the process by which the spectacle intercepts socially and politically radical ideas and images, commodifies them, and safely incorporates them back within mainstream society. More broadly, it may refer to the appropriation or co-opting of any subversive works or ideas by mainstream media. It is the opposite of détournement, in which conventional ideas and images are reorganized and recontextualized with radical intentions.

Debord discusses the close link between revolution and culture and everyday life, and the reason why conservative powers are interested in forbidding them "any direct access to the rigged game of official culture." Debord recalls that worldwide revolutionary movements that emerged during the 1920s were followed by "an ebbing of the movements that had tried to advance a liberatory new attitude in culture and everyday life," and that such movements were brought to a "complete social isolation."

Different forms
In Comments on the Society of the Spectacle (1988), Debord modified his argument, and claimed that the spectacle manifests itself in three different forms:

Concentrated spectacle
The spectacle associated with concentrated bureaucracy.  Debord associated this spectacular form mostly with the Eastern Bloc and Fascism, although today mixed backward economies import it, and even advanced capitalist countries in times of crisis. Every aspect of life, like property, music, and communication is concentrated and is identified with the bureaucratic class. The concentrated spectacle generally identifies itself with a powerful political leader. The concentrated spectacle is made effective through a state of permanent violence and police terror.

Diffuse spectacle
The diffuse spectacle is the spectacle associated with advanced capitalism and commodity abundance. In the diffuse spectacle, different commodities conflict with each other, preventing the consumer from consuming the whole. Each commodity claims itself as the only existent one, and tries to impose itself over the other commodities:

The diffuse spectacle is more effective than the concentrated spectacle. The diffuse spectacle operates mostly through seduction, while the concentrated spectacle operates mostly through violence. Because of this, Debord argues that the diffuse spectacle is more effective at suppressing non-spectacular opinions than the concentrated spectacle.

Integrated spectacle
The spectacle associated with modern capitalist countries. The integrated spectacle borrows traits from the diffuse and concentrated spectacle to form a new synthesis. Debord argues that this is a very recent form of spectacular manifestation, and  that it was pioneered in France and Italy. According to Debord, the integrated spectacle goes by the label of liberal democracy. This spectacle introduces a state of permanent general secrecy, where experts and specialists dictate the morality, statistics, and opinions of the spectacle. Terrorism is the invented enemy of the spectacle, which specialists compare with their "liberal democracy", pointing out the superiority of the latter one.  Debord argues that without terrorism, the integrated spectacle wouldn't survive, for it needs to be compared to something in order to show its "obvious" perfection and superiority.

Legacy
A long tradition of work exists in political science on the "political spectacle" started with Debord; many literary critics and philosophers in the 20th century contributed to this analysis. According to anthropologist Meg McLagan, "Debord analyzes the penetration of the commodity form into mass communication, which he argues results in the spectacle". Andrew Hussey claims in his biography of Debord that the term spectacle began life not in a Marxist context, but was first borrowed from Nietzsche and his concept of the mass secret. The critic Sadie Plant argues that later theories of postmodernism, particularly those of Baudrillard and Lyotard, owe much to Debord's theory, and represent an apolitical appropriation of its criticism of the unreality of life under late capitalism. Debord was a rebel to his core and despised academic commodification of his ideas and their integration into the diffuse spectacle. Throughout his life he fought to make his ideas truly revolutionary. 

In Green Illusions, Ozzie Zehner draws largely on Debord to argue that the spectacles of solar cells, wind turbines, and other technologies have organized environmental thinking around energy-production at the expense of energy-reduction strategies.

See also
 Aestheticization of politics, a concept coined by Walter Benjamin in his 1935 essay

Notes

References
Eskilson, Stephen (2005) The Spectacle at the Fair in Deborah J. Johnson, David Ogawa, Kermit Swiler Champa Seeing and Beyond: A Festschrift on Eighteenth to Twenty-First Century Art in Honor of Kermit S. Champa,  ed. Deborah J. Johnson and David Ogawa (Bern, Berlin, Frankfurt and New  York: Peter Lang Verlag
Debord, Guy (1977) [1967]. The Society of the Spectacle, translation by Fredy Perlman and Jon Supak (Black & Red, 1970; rev. ed. 1977). Online at Library.nothingness.org and at Wikisource

Further reading
Adorno (1963) Culture Industry Reconsidered

Situationist International
Social philosophy
1967 introductions